Yvonne Elsworth FRS FInstP FRAS is an Irish physicist, Professor of Helioseismology and Poynting Professor of Physics in the School of Physics and Astronomy at the University of Birmingham. Elsworth was until 2015 also the Head of the Birmingham Solar Oscillations Network (BiSON), the longest running helioseismology network with data covering well over three solar cycles.

Education
In 1970 Elsworth graduated with honours from the Victoria University of Manchester with a Bachelor of Science degree in Physics. In 1976 she was awarded a Doctor of Philosophy degree from the School of Physics at the Victoria University of Manchester. Her thesis work was entitled "A field-compensated multiplex spectrometer for the visible region" and was concerned with the design and implementation of a novel form of field-widened Michelson interferometer designed to study faint, extended sources like those coming from optical emission from the thermosphere.

Research
In 1984 Elsworth was appointed to a faculty position at the University of Birmingham, where she focused on helioseismology, solar physics, solar variability, and latterly asteroseismology, stellar physics and stellar variability. She participated in and later led the Birmingham Solar Oscillation Network. Her research has been funded by the Science and Technology Facilities Council (STFC).

Awards and honours
Elsworth was elected a Fellow of the Royal Society (FRS) in 2015 for her work on helioseismology. Her certificate of election reads: 

In 2011 she was awarded the Payne-Gaposchkin Medal and Prize from the Institute of Physics (IoP). and in 2020 the Gold Medal of the Royal Astronomical Society in Geophysics.
 
Elsworth is also a Fellow of the Institute of Physics (FInstP) and a Fellow of the Royal Astronomical Society (FRAS).

References

Year of birth missing (living people)
Living people
British physicists
21st-century British astronomers
Women astronomers
Fellows of the Royal Society
Female Fellows of the Royal Society
Alumni of the Victoria University of Manchester
Academics of the University of Birmingham
Fellows of the Institute of Physics
Fellows of the Royal Astronomical Society
Recipients of the Gold Medal of the Royal Astronomical Society